Tideng Pale (abbreviated as: TDP) is a village in Tana Tidung Regency, North Kalimantan Province of Indonesia and the administrative capital of its regency.

Climate
Tideng Pale has a tropical rainforest climate (Af) with heavy rainfall year-round.

References

Populated places in North Kalimantan
Regency seats of North Kalimantan